Ain Laloui is a town and commune in Bouïra Province, Algeria. According to the 1998 census, it has a population of 5,893.

References

Communes of Bouïra Province